Atom-Powered Action! was the first Bis release on label mainstay Wiiija Records.  It could be up to debate as to if this release is a single or an EP considering that "Starbright Boy" showed up on The New Transistor Heroes. It was released on 7 inch vinyl, cassette tape and compact disc.

Track listing
All tracks written by Bis.

"Starbright Boy" (3:39)
"Wee Love" (1:24)
"Team Theme" (2:42)
"Cliquesuck" (2:50)

Production
 Recorded by - Jim Brady
 Artwork - Ms.Rin

Charts

References

Bis (Scottish band) EPs
1996 EPs